A companion dog is a dog that does not work, providing only companionship as a pet, rather than usefulness by doing specific tasks. Many of the toy dog breeds are used only for the pleasure of their company, not as workers. Any dog can be a companion dog, and many working types such as retrievers are enjoyed primarily for their friendly nature as a family pet, as are mixed breed dogs.  The American Kennel Club also offers a Companion dog title for judged dog obedience competitions.

Working vs. companion

Breed groups argue that any dog in the working group type is inherently a "working" dog, while others argue that only a dog with an active occupation, either in a breed-related field (such as water trials for retrievers or herding trials for herding dogs) or in a breed-nonspecific field that requires training and discipline, such as being assistance dogs or participating in dog agility, can be considered a working dog.

Dogs that have been chosen for traits that make a convenient pet are generally smaller breeds, and the tradition of keeping pretty dogs for no purpose other than to be court decorations stems back thousands of years to Chinese nobility. The Pekingese and the Pug are both examples of canines chosen for their ability to be pets. In the case of the Pekingese, it was for their lion-like demeanor; for the Pugs, it was for their "lucky" wrinkles and their monkey-like face.

Other dogs that appear to be strictly a decorative or entertaining breed of dog originally also had jobs outside of their main companionship task, such as the Lhasa Apso's job as a watch dog, or the delicate Yorkshire Terrier's exceptional rat-catching abilities.

Competition Obedience Titles
Companion Dog ("CD" added to the dog's registered name) - is officially a "Novice obedience Title" in the AKC Competition Obedience Ring, whereby a team enters the "ring" with 200 points, and needs to leave with at least 170 points to "qualify". It requires three "legs" (trials) under three different AKC judges. Any dog can earn a CD title. Levels for obedience are Companion Dog (CD), Companion Dog Excellent (CDX), Utility Dog (UD), Utility Dog Excellent (UDX), Obedience Trial Champion (OTCH), and National Obedience Champion (NOC). A pet dog is not considered a "Companion Dog" without entering a competition ring and creating a document trail. The first AKC licensed obedience trial was held in 1936, where 200 dogs were entered.

Companion versus toy dogs

Toy dogs and companion dogs have a large overlap. However, companion dogs are not limited by size, whereas all toy dogs are small.

References 

Dog roles
Dogs as pets
 Companion dogs